Thomas M. Bowen (1835–1906) was a U.S. Senator from Colorado. Senator Bowen may also refer to:

Bill Bowen (1929–1999), Ohio State Senate
Debra Bowen (born 1955), California State Senate
Ezra A. Bowen (fl. 1850s), Wisconsin State Senate
George Bowen (New York politician) (1831–1921), New York State Senate
John Clyde Bowen (1888–1978), Washington State Senate
John W. Bowen (1926–2011), Ohio State Senate
Joseph R. Bowen (born 1950), Kentucky State Senate
Rooney L. Bowen (1933–2016), Georgia State Senate
Shepard P. Bowen (1824–1908), New York State Senate
Thomas Bowen (Wisconsin politician) (1808–1883), Wisconsin State Senate
William H. Bower (1850–1910), North Carolina State Senate